The 2020 Pittsburgh Pirates season was the franchise's 139th season overall, 134th season as a member of the National League, and 20th season at PNC Park.

On March 12, 2020, MLB announced that because of the ongoing COVID-19 pandemic, the start of the regular season would be delayed by at least two weeks in addition to the remainder of spring training being cancelled. Four days later, it was announced that the start of the season would be pushed back indefinitely due to the recommendation made by the CDC to restrict events of more than 50 people for eight weeks. On June 23, commissioner Rob Manfred unilaterally implemented a 60-game season. Players reported to training camps on July 1 in order to resume spring training and prepare for a July 24 Opening Day.

The Pirates finished the season with an MLB-worst record of 19–41. The team's .317 winning percentage was their worst since 1952. The Pirates would have set a new MLB record for the fewest games won in any official season, finishing with one fewer win than the notorious 1899 Cleveland Spiders, although the 1899 Spiders played 154 games.  As a result of the shortened season, and the winning percentage of .317 winning percentage would have been a net of 51 games in a 162-game season, the 19 wins is not recognised as one of baseball's worst records.

Season standings

National League Central

National League playoff standings

Record vs. opponents

Detailed records

Game log

|-style="background:#fbb;"
|1||July 24||@ Cardinals || 4–5 || Flaherty (1–0) || Musgrove (0–1) || Kim (1) || 0–1 || L1
|-style="background:#fbb;"
|2||July 25||@ Cardinals || 1–9 || Wainwright (1–0) || Williams (0–1) || — || 0–2 || L2
|-style="background:#cfc;"
|3||July 26||@ Cardinals || 5–1 || Keller (1–0) || Hudson (0–1) || — || 1–2 || W1
|-style="background:#fbb;"
|4||July 27||Brewers || 5–6  || Phelps (1–0) || Neverauskas (0–1) || — ||  1–3 || L1
|-style="background:#cfc;"
|5||July 28||Brewers || 8–6 || Hartlieb (1–0) || Wahl (0–1) || Burdi (1) ||  2–3 || W1
|-style="background:#fbb;"
|6||July 29||Brewers || 0–3 || Woodruff (1–1) || Musgrove (0–2) || Hader (1) || 2–4 || L1
|-style="background:#fbb;"
|7||July 31||@ Cubs || 3–6 || Darvish (1–1) || Williams (0–2) || — || 2–5 || L2
|-

|-style="background:#fbb;"
|8||August 1||@ Cubs || 3–4 || Chatwood (2–0) || Keller (1–1) || Wick (1) ||  2–6 || L3
|-style="background:#fbb;"
|9||August 2||@ Cubs || 1–2  ||  Jeffress (1–0) || Ponce (0–1)  || — ||  2–7 || L4
|-style="background:#fbb;"
|10||August 3||@ Twins || 4–5 || Rogers (1–0) || Burdi (0–1) || — ||  2–8 || L5
|-style="background:#fbb;"
|11||August 4||@ Twins || 3–7 || Berríos (1–1) || Musgrove (0–3) || May (1) || 2–9 || L6
|-style="background:#fbb;"
|12||August 5||Twins || 2–5 || Dobnak (2–1) || Williams (0–3) || — || 2–10 || L7
|-style="background:#cfc;"
|13||August 6||Twins || 6–5 || Howard (1–0) || Rogers (1–1) || — || 3–10 || W1
|-style="background:#fbb;"
|14||August 7||Tigers || 13–17  || Garcia (2–0) || Neverauskas (0–2) || — || 3–11 || L1
|-style="background:#fbb;"
|15||August 8||Tigers || 5–11 || Nova (1–0) || Holland (0–1) || — || 3–12 || L2 
|-style="background:#fbb;"
|16||August 9||Tigers || 1–2 || Turnbull (2–0) || Rodríguez (0–1) || Jiménez (5) || 3–13 || L3
|-style="background:#bbbbbb;"
|—||August 10||@ Cardinals || colspan="7" | Postponed (COVID-19) (Makeup date: August 27)  
|-style="background:#bbbbbb;"
|—||August 11||@ Cardinals || colspan="7" | Postponed (COVID-19) (Makeup date: August 27) 
|-style="background:#bbbbbb;"
|—||August 12||@ Cardinals || colspan="7" | Postponed (COVID-19) (Makeup date: September 18) 
|-style="background:#cfc;"
|17||August 13||@ Reds || 9–6 || Williams (1–3) || DeSclafani (1–1) || — || 4–13 || W1
|-style="background:#fbb;"
|18||August 14||@ Reds || 1–8 || Gray (4–1) || Kuhl (0–1) || — || 4–14 || L1
|-style="background:#bbbbbb;"
|—||August 15||@ Reds || colspan="7" | Postponed (COVID-19) (Makeup date: September 4) 
|-style="background:#bbbbbb;"
|—||August 16||@ Reds || colspan="7" | Postponed (COVID-19) (Makeup date: September 14) 
|-style="background:#fbb;"
|19||August 18||Indians || 3–6  || Wittgren (1–0) || Howard (1–1) || Hand (6) || 4–15 || L2
|-style="background:#fbb;"
|20||August 19||Indians || 1–6 || Civale (3–2) || Neverauskas (0–3) || — || 4–16 || L3
|-style="background:#fbb;"
|21||August 20||Indians || 0–2 || Bieber (5–0) || Williams (1–4) || Hand (7) || 4–17 || L4
|-style="background:#cfc;"
|22||August 21||Brewers || 7–2 || Kuhl (1–1) || Houser (1–2) || — || 5–17 || W1
|-style="background:#cfc;"
|23||August 22||Brewers || 12–5 || Holland (1–1) || Lindblom (1–1) || — || 6–17 || W2
|-style="background:#cfc;"
|24||August 23||Brewers || 5–4 || Stratton (1–0) || Phelps (2–3) || Rodríguez (1) || 7–17 || W3
|-style="background:#fbb;"
|25||August 25||@ White Sox || 0–4 || Giolito (3–2) || Brault (0–1) || — || 7–18 || L1
|-style="background:#fbb;"
|26||August 26||@ White Sox || 3–10 || Keuchel (5–2) || Williams (1–5) || — || 7–19 || L2
|-style="background:#cfc;"
|27||August 27 ||@ Cardinals || 4–3  || Stratton (2–0) || Gant (0–2) || Rodríguez (2) || 8–19 || W1
|-style="background:#cfc;"
|28||August 27 ||@ Cardinals || 2–0  || Ponce (1–1) || Oviedo (0–1) || Turley (1) || 9–19 || W2
|-style="background:#fbb;"
|29||August 28||@ Brewers || 1–9 || Burnes (1–0) || Holland (1–2) || — || 9–20 || L1
|-style="background:#fbb;"
|30||August 29||@ Brewers || 6–7 || Williams (2–1) || Rodríguez (0–2) || — || 9–21 || L2
|-style="background:#cfc;"
|31||August 30||@ Brewers || 5–1 || Tropeano (1–0) || Woodruff (2–3) || — || 10–21 || W1
|-style="background:#fbb;"
|32||August 31||@ Brewers || 5–6 || Williams (3–1) || Turley (0–1) || Hader (8) || 10–22 || L1
|-

|-style="background:#fbb;"
|33||September 1||Cubs || 7–8  || Jeffress (3–1) || Crick (0–1) || — || 10–23 || L2
|-style="background:#fbb;"
|34||September 2||Cubs || 2–8 || Hendricks (4–4) || Musgrove (0–4) || — || 10–24 || L3
|-style="background:#cfc;"
|35||September 3||Cubs || 6–2 || Brubaker (1–0) || Mills (3–3) || — || 11–24 || W1
|-style="background:#fbb;"
|36||September 4  ||Reds || 2–4  || Castillo (1–5) || Brault (0–2) || Iglesias (5) || 11–25 || L1
|-style="background:#cfc;"
|37||September 4  ||@ Reds || 4–3  || Howard (2–1) || Bauer (3–3) || Rodríguez (3) || 12–25 || W1 
|-style="background:#fbb;"
|38||September 5||Reds || 2–6 || Garrett (1–0) || Williams (1–6) || — || 12–26 || L1
|-style="background:#cfc;"
|39||September 6||Reds || 3–2 || Rodríguez (1–2) || Iglesias (2–3) || — || 13–26 || W1
|-style="background:#cfc;"
|40||September 8||White Sox || 5–4 || Rodríguez (2–2) || Detwiler (1–1) || — || 14–26 || W2
|-style="background:#fbb;"
|41||September 9||White Sox || 1–8 || Dunning (1–0) || Brubaker (1–1) || — || 14–27 || L1
|-style="background:#fbb;"
|42||September 11||@ Royals || 3–4 || Bubic (1–5) || Brault (0–3) || Holland (4) || 14–28 || L2
|-style="background:#fbb;"
|43||September 12||@ Royals || 4–7 || Zimmer (1–0) || Williams (1–7) || Holland (5) || 14–29 || L3
|-style="background:#fbb;"
|44||September 13||@ Royals || 0–11 || Keller (4–2) || Kuhl (1–2) || — || 14–30 || L4 
|-style="background:#fbb;"
|45||September 14  ||@ Reds || 1–3  || Iglesias (3–3) || Howard (2–2) || — || 14–31 || L5
|-style="background:#fbb;"
|46||September 14  ||@ Reds || 4–9  || Romano (1–0) || Turley (0–2) || — || 14–32 || L6
|-style="background:#fbb;"
|47||September 15||@ Reds || 1–4 || Lorenzen (2–1) || Musgrove (0–5) || Garrett (1) || 14–33 || L7
|-style="background:#fbb;"
|48||September 16||@ Reds || 0–1 || Castillo (3–5) || Brubaker (1–2) || Iglesias (8) || 14–34 || L8
|-style="background:#cfc;"
|49||September 17||Cardinals || 5–1 || Brault (1–3) || Gomber (0–1) || — || 15–34 || W1
|-style="background:#fbb;"
|50||September 18 ||Cardinals || 5–6  || Reyes (2–1) || Williams (1–8) || Helsley (1) || 15–35 || L1
|-style="background:#fbb;"
|51||September 18 ||@ Cardinals || 2–7  || Miller (1–1) || Kuhl (1–3) || — || 15–36 || L2
|-style="background:#fbb;"
|52||September 19||Cardinals || 4–5 || Woodford (1–0) || Howard (2–3) || Cabrera (1) || 15–37 || L3
|-style="background:#fbb;"
|53||September 20||Cardinals || 1–2 || Flaherty (4–2) || Holland (1–3) || Miller (3) || 15–38 || L4
|-style="background:#fbb;"
|54||September 21||Cubs || 0–5 || Lester (2–1) || Brubaker (1–3) || — || 15–39 || L5
|-style="background:#cfc;"
|55||September 22||Cubs || 3–2 || Rodríguez (3–2) || Chafin (1–2) || — || 16–39 || W1
|-style="background:#cfc;"
|56||September 23||Cubs || 2–1 || Williams (2–8) || Hendricks (6–5) || Rodríguez (4) || 17–39 || W2
|-style="background:#cfc;"
|57||September 24||Cubs || 7–0 || Kuhl (2–3) || Mills (5–5) || — || 18–39 || W3
|-style="background:#fbb;"
|58||September 25||@ Indians || 3–4 || Plutko (2–2) || Stratton (2–1) || — || 18–40 || L1
|-style="background:#cfc;"
|59||September 26||@ Indians || 8–0 || Musgrove (1–5) || Civale (4–6) || — || 19–40 || W1
|-style="background:#fbb;"
|60||September 27||@ Indians || 6–8 || Karinchak (1–2) || Turley (0–3) || Hand (16) || 19–41 || L1
|-

|- style="text-align:center;"
| Legend:       = Win       = Loss       = PostponementBold = Pirates team member

Roster

Farm system

References

External links
Pittsburgh Pirates 2020 schedule at MLB.com

Pittsburgh Pirates seasons
Pittsburgh Pirates
Pittsburgh Pirates
2020s in Pittsburgh